The Melanesia Cup 1992 was the fourth Melanesia-wide tournament ever held. It took place in Vanuatu and four teams participated: Fiji, Solomon Islands, New Caledonia and Vanuatu.

The teams played each other according to a round-robin format with Fiji winning the tournament for the third time. 
All matches were played in National Stadium in Port Vila.

Results

Melanesia Cup
1991–92 in OFC football
1992
1992 in Vanuatuan sport
July 1992 sports events in Oceania